Vestas 11th Hour Racing was a Volvo Ocean 65 class yacht team competing in the 2017–2018 Volvo Ocean Race. Is was named after 11th Hour Racing, a program of The Schmidt Family Foundation and it's then title sponsors: a wind turbine manufacturer Vestas Wind Systems A/S. After the COVID-19 pandemic disruption the team changed yacht class to IMOCA 60 and no longer had Vestas as a sponsor. It now competes in the 2023 The Ocean Race as 11th Hour Racing.

The team finished fifth in the 2017–18 Volvo Ocean Race and in the 2014–15 Volvo Ocean Race, when she was known as Team Alvimedica and skippered by Charlie Enright.

Between the two races, Vestas 11th Hour Racing was extensively refitted along with the other Volvo Ocean 65's.

2017-2018 Volvo Ocean Race 
Charlie Enright (skipper)
Simon Fisher
Mark Towill     (Team director)
Damian Foxall
Nick Dana
Tom Johnson
Tony Mutter
Stacey Jackson
Hannah Diamond
Roberto Bermúdez de Castro Muñoz
Jena Hansen

2014-2015 Volvo Ocean Race 
 Charlie Enright (skipper & team co-founder)
 Mark Towill (team co-founder)
 Will Oxley (Navigator)
 Alberto Bolzan
 Nick Dana
 Ryan Houston
 Dave Swete
 Amory Ross (On-Board Reporter)
 Sébastien Marsset / Stu Bannatyne

References

Volvo Ocean Race yachts
Volvo Ocean 65 yachts
2010s sailing yachts
Sailing yachts designed by Farr Yacht Design